Teresa Tseng is a Taiwanese singer and actress. She is known for coming in second place in the Singaporean television music competition Campus SuperStar, as well as starring in several Singaporean television series, such as Let It Shine and Table of Glory.

Career
While Tseng was attending CHIJ Katong Convent, she participated in the Singaporean television music competition Campus SuperStar, where she came in second place. Following this, she starred in the drama television series Let It Shine in 2007. She then starred in the sports and romance drama television series Table of Glory.

She returned to Taiwan after graduating from Ngee Ann Polytechnic in 2013 to pursue a singing career. She participated in the Chinese reality singing competition Chinese Idol and the Taiwanese reality singing competition Chinese Million Star later that year. She released her first EP, Want To Meet Someone, in 2016. She returned to Singapore in 2017 to star in the television drama Mind Matters.

References

Living people
Taiwanese television actresses
21st-century Taiwanese women singers
Year of birth missing (living people)